Oro Valley, incorporated in 1974, is a suburban town located  north of Tucson, Arizona, United States, in Pima County. According to the 2020 census, the population of the town is 47,070, an increase from 29,700 in 2000. Dubbed the "Upscale Tech Mecca" of Southern Arizona by the Arizona Daily Star newspaper, Oro Valley is home to over 10 high tech firms and has a median household income nearly 50% higher than the U.S. median.

Oro Valley is situated in the western foothills of the Santa Catalina Mountains at the base of Pusch Ridge. The Tortolita Mountains are located north of the town, and vistas of the Tucson valley are to the south. The town occupies the middle Cañada del Oro Valley.  Oro Valley hosts a large number of residents from around the US who maintain second or winter homes in the town.

The town hosted the 2006 Pac-10 Women's Golf Championships at the Oro Valley Country Club. Oro Valley Country Club was also the site for the 2006 Girls' Junior America's Cup, a major amateur golf tournament for the Western United States.   Annual events in Oro Valley include the Oro Valley Festival of the Arts, El Tour de Tucson bicycle race, the Oro Valley Music Festival, the Tucson Marathon, the Cactus Speed Classic for inline skaters, the Oro Valley Triathlon, and the Arizona Distance Classic.

History

Pre-U.S. annexation period
The area of Oro Valley has been inhabited discontinuously for nearly two thousand years by various groups of people. The Native American Hohokam tribe lived in the Honeybee Village in the foothills of the Tortolita Mountains on Oro Valley's far north side around 450 A.D. Hohokam artifacts continue to be discovered in the Honeybee Village that the Hohokam inhabited continuously for nearly 800 years, and studied by archaeologists around the globe.

Early in the 16th century, Native American tribes known as the Apache arrived in the southern Arizona area, including Oro Valley. These tribes inhabited the region only a few decades prior to the arrival of the Spanish Conquistadors, including Francisco Coronado. The Spanish established forts in the area, including the Presidio at Tucson (1775) beginning in the late 16th century.

Arizona Territorial period
Beginning in the 19th century, Americans increasingly settled in the Arizona Territory, following the Mexican–American War and the subsequent Gadsden Purchase including Southern Arizona. Following the Civil War and several Army efforts to pacify the Apaches, Tucson settlers ventured north to settle Oro Valley. Francisco Romero, from a Hispanic family tracing its Tucson roots to the early nineteenth century, established a ranch in what is Catalina State Park today by 1869.  He constructed ranch buildings on the foundations of the Hohokam ruins in the park. Romero lived there intermittently from 1869 to his death in 1905. Members of the Romero family occupied land in that same area until 1930.

George Pusch, a German immigrant, occupied land in the area of Oro Valley after 1874, establishing a cattle ranch. This ranch was unique because it utilized a steam pump to provide water, eventually popularizing Pusch's property as the Steam Pump Ranch on the Cañada del Oro. The steam pump was one of only two in the Arizona Territory. Pusch and his family never lived on the ranch.  They visited frequently and employed caretakers to manage the property. George Pusch, and later the Pusch Land and Cattle Company, owned Steam Pump Ranch until 1925. Pusch's ranch provided respite for settlers and travelers entering and leaving the Tucson area. Pusch Ridge is named in honor of George Pusch.

Ranching continued to flourish in the area as greater numbers of Americans settled in the Arizona Territory and the state of Arizona. Federal homesteads became available after 1903 when surveys of land were completed. Homesteads were claimed by individuals from 1903 until the 1940s. Hispanic homesteaders included Francisco Romero, Jesus Elias, Francisco Marin, Francisco Aragon and others. Female homesteaders included Ina Gittings, Mabel Burke Johnson, Margaret Moodie and others.  Other prominent homesteaders included William Sutherland, James Reidy and David Morgan.

Large ranching families came to the Oro Valley area in the period 1930–1960. Many of these were wealthy individuals from the Midwest and the East.  They vacationed in Tucson during the period and became interested in living in the desert. They purchased many of the homesteads occupied by original settlers who sold out after 1930.  These wealthy ranchers obtained properties of 1000 to 7000 acres.  They usually lived on the ranches in the winter months and employed caretakers to manage the property and cattle.  These wealthy ranchers included Walter McDonald, John Procter, Lawrence Rooney, Joseph McAdams and Lloyd and Betty Golder.

Gold rushers into the American West also were attracted to southern Arizona, where gold was said to be in abundance in and around the Santa Catalina Mountains north of Tucson. Fueled by the legend of the lost Iron Door Gold Mine in the mountains, those in search of gold trekked through the Oro Valley area focusing their attention along the Cañada del Oro washbed.  No significant amounts of gold were found locally.

Post-World War II period
After World War II, the Tucson area experienced dramatic population growth, impacting Oro Valley as well. Property owners began subdividing local real estate for development in the early 1930s.  Construction of Campo Bello, the first suburban development, began in 1948. Lots in the Linda Vista Citrus Tracts were sold from the late 1930s to the 1960s and occupied by residents.  In the early 1950s the Oro Valley Country Club opened at the base of Pusch Ridge, affirming the area's future as an affluent community. The Suffolk Hills development was constructed in the period 1960–1962. Although one tract housing development was built in the area in the early 1950s, the majority of homes in the Oro Valley area were built by individual land owners on large lots in a low density residential style.

Founding of the town
The community continued to grow gradually, and area residents increasingly desired local control of the land in the area. In the late 1960s, incorporation became a greater focus in Oro Valley.  Tucson mayor James M. Corbett, Jr. expressed great interest in expanding the Tucson city limits to the far north side of Pima County. Corbett vowed to bring the Oro Valley area into Tucson "kicking and screaming," alluding to the reservations Oro Valley residents expressed in joining Tucson.

A petition to incorporate began circulation in Oro Valley in 1968. The Pima County Board of Supervisors officially refused to allow Oro Valley to incorporate, and litigation followed. Ultimately, the Arizona Supreme Court ruled in favor of incorporation, and in 1974 the Town of Oro Valley was incorporated with only . The original town limits included the Linda Vista Citrus Tracts, Campo Bello Estates, Shadow Mountain Estates, and Oro Valley Country Club Estates. Activity in Oro Valley centered primarily around the Oro Valley Country Club and Canyon del Oro High School. While originally referred to as Palo Verde, town founders proceeded with incorporation efforts with the official name of Oro Valley to garner support from influential residents of Oro Valley Country Club. The town began with a population of nearly 1,200.

Through the 1980s and particularly in the 1990s Oro Valley experienced significant residential and commercial growth. In 1990 the town had a population of 6,670, and by 2000 that figure had increased to 29,700 residents. During that time, residential communities of all housing-unit densities were developed in the town, including several master-planned communities. For several years in the 1990s Oro Valley was the fastest growing municipality in Arizona.

Current state of the town
Formed by citizens of Oro Valley, the not-for-profit Oro Valley Historical Society has a mission in "preserving the Town's heritage for future generations."

Geography

Oro Valley is located at  (32.4212, −110.9760) in the middle Cañada del Oro Valley.

The topography of Oro Valley is distinguished by the Cañada del Oro riverbed bisecting the town. The eastern banks of the Cañada del Oro rise dramatically to the Santa Catalina Mountains. The western banks of the Cañada del Oro rise more gradually to a plateau and the foothills of the Tortolita Mountains farther north.

Notable geographic features include:
 Pusch Ridge (peak elevation: 5,366 ft.) & Pusch Ridge Wilderness Area
 Santa Catalina Mountains (peak elevation: 9,157 ft.)
 Cañada del Oro
 Tortolita Mountains (peak elevation: 4,696 ft.)

Parks

Major parks in Oro Valley include the oldest, James D. Kriegh Park (formerly Dennis Weaver Park), with an Olympic-sized swimming pool, recreational fields, and racquetball courts. The Cañada del Oro Riverfront Park features tennis and basketball courts, recreational fields, walking trails, and connections to equestrian trails along the Cañada del Oro wash. West Lambert Lane Park in Cañada Hills is a nature park with a number of hiking trails.

The largest park, Naranja Park, is a 213-acre regional park located in the middle of the town.  The park features four multi-sport fields, a playground, a dog park, an archery range, multiple walking trails, and is home to the Sonoran Desert Flyers, an organization dedicated to radio control model aircraft.  The park is currently undergoing a $25 million expansion that will add four new multi-sport fields, six pickleball courts, two basketball courts, a splash pad, a BMX track and a skate park.

Catalina State Park and the Coronado National Forest in the Santa Catalina Mountains form the eastern boundary of Oro Valley.

Linda Vista Trail, located east of Oracle Road on Linda Vista Drive, south of 1st Avenue, is a nature trail that provides views of Oro Valley, Pusch Ridge, and the surrounding vicinity.

The Oro Valley Historical Society (founded 2005), in cooperation with the Town of Oro Valley and Pima County, is working to maintain, restore, and interpret two park sites in Oro Valley.
 Honeybee Village 
 Steam Pump Ranch 

La Cholla Airpark, a private airport community, is also in northwestern Oro Valley. La Cholla Airpark was founded in 1972 and includes nearly 100 residential estates. A  air strip is situated at the center of the community for member use.

Climate

Oro Valley has very similar weather conditions to Tucson,  due to their proximity to one another; however, there are small differences. Oro Valley sees slightly less rain throughout the year due to being west of the Santa Catalina Mountains and most of Tucson being to the south or southwest of the mountains. The general temperature of Oro Valley is slightly cooler than Tucson year round due to the higher elevation. Wind tends to flow in a north, northwesterly direction and the sun rises later than Tucson due to the Santa Catalina Mountains.

Demographics

2020 census
As of the census of 2020, there were 47,070 people and 20,754 households in Oro Valley.  The town's population increased by 14.7% between 2010 and 2020. The population density was 1,154.4 people per square mile. There were 22,346 housing units in Oro Valley. The racial makeup of the town was 84.2% non-Hispanic White, 2.3% Black or African American, 0.3% Native American, 3.6% Asian, 0.1% Pacific Islander, and 6.6% from two or more races. 15.4% of the population were Hispanic or Latino of any race.

In the town, the population was spread out, with 3.3% under the age of 5, 14.6% from 5 to 17, 52.5% from 18 to 64, and 34.6% who were 65 years of age or older. The median age was 54 years. Oro Valley was 48% male and 52% female.

The median income for a household in the town was $92,540, and the per capita income for the town was $53,411. 6.7% of the population was below the poverty line.

2010 census
As of the census of 2010, there were 41,011 people and 17,364 households in Oro Valley. The population density was 1,154.4 people per square mile. There were 20,340 housing units in Oro Valley. The racial makeup of the town was 81.9% non-Hispanic White, 1.5% Black or African American, 0.4% Native American, 3.1% Asian, 0.1% Pacific Islander, and 2.4% from two or more races. 11.5% of the population were Hispanic or Latino of any race.

In the town, the population was spread out, with 3.9% under the age of 5, 19.2% from 5 to 17, 50.8% from 18 to 64, and 26.1% who were 65 years of age or older. The median age was 50 years. Oro Valley was 47% male and 53% female.

The median income for a household in the town was $68,784, and the per capita income for the town was $39,397. 5.3% of the population was below the poverty line.

2000 census
As of the census of 2000, there were 29,700 people, 12,249 households, and 9,382 families residing in the town. The racial makeup of the town was 93.1% White, 1.1% Black or African American, 0.4% Native American, 1.9% Asian, 0.1% Pacific Islander, 1.8% from other races, and 1.6% from two or more races. 7.5% of the population were Hispanic or Latino of any race.

There were 12,249 households, out of which 27.0% had children under the age of 18 living with them, 69.8% were married couples living together, 4.9% had a female householder with no husband present, and 23.4% were non-families. 19.4% of all households were made up of individuals, and 8.2% had someone living alone who was 65 years of age or older. The average household size was 2.41 and the average family size was 2.76.

In the town, the population was spread out, with 21.5% under the age of 18, 4.5% from 18 to 24, 23.5% from 25 to 44, 27.7% from 45 to 64, and 22.7% who were 65 years of age or older. The median age was 45 years. For every 100 females, there were 94.4 males. For every 100 females age 18 and over, there were 91.0 males.

According to a 2007 estimate, the median income for a household in the town was $74,015, and the median income for a family was $80,807. Males had a median income of $55,522 versus $31,517 for females. The per capita income for the town was $31,134. 3.1% of the population and 2.4% of families were below the poverty line.   2.0% of those under the age of 18 and 2.2% of those 65 and older were living below the poverty line.

Economy

Innovation Park is the high-tech center of Oro Valley, featuring a number of medical and biotech campuses. Primary employers in Oro Valley include:
 Sanofi-Aventis: The world's third largest pharmaceutical company finished construction on a new  facility in Innovation Park in 2009.
 Ventana Medical Systems: The  international headquarters for the company are in Innovation Park. In 2008, Ventana was purchased by Roche Diagnostics. The firm has officially been renamed as Roche Tissue Diagnostics, maintaining "Ventana" as a brand.
 Oro Valley Hospital: The  hospital, along with a  medical office building in Innovation Park opened in 2008.
 Honeywell: Honeywell is the producer of electronic control systems and automation equipment.  (The Honeywell facility is actually in unincorporated Pima County, completely surrounded by the town of Oro Valley.)

Golf and resorts
Oro Valley features several resorts and country clubs, including:

Arts
Each winter, Musical Magic for Kids is held at the Oro Valley Town Hall, along with multiple string quartet and choral performances throughout the town.

Every April, the Oro Valley Festival of the Arts is held celebrating all forms of art and artistic expression. Live musical performances are held throughout the spring in the open-air amphitheater at Cañada del Oro Riverfront Park.

The annual Independence Day celebration is one of the largest events in Oro Valley. The Tucson Symphony Orchestra performs, along with several choirs. Fireworks shows and concerts are also provided by the Hilton El Conquistador Resort.

The Oro Valley Music Festival is an annual outdoor music festival held over two days at the Golf Club at Vistoso, typically during the first weekend of October. The 2017 lineup included artists such as Gavin DeGraw, Lee Brice, LeAnn Rimes, Brothers Osborn and Echosmith.

Public art is exhibited throughout the year at the Oro Valley Hospital in Rancho Vistoso. A number of sculptures, murals, and statues of public art are featured throughout Oro Valley.

Law and government
The Town of Oro Valley employs the council-manager form of municipal government. Oro Valley is administered by the seven-member town council. The town council oversees all issues pertaining to Oro Valley, including residential and commercial development and natural preservation.

Oro Valley residents elect all seven members of the town council, including a directly elected mayor. The vice mayor is appointed by the council from amongst its elected Councilmembers. The mayor and vice mayor have no special powers and duties beyond chairing meetings, but rather serve as rank and file council members.
 Mayor: Mr. Joseph C Winfield (term expires November 2026)
 Vice mayor: Mrs. Melanie Barrett (term expires November 2026)

The remaining members of the Oro Valley Town Council include:
 Mr. Timothy Bohen (term expires November 2024)
 Mr. Harry "Mo" Green II (term expires November 2024)
 Mrs. Joyce Jones-Ivey (term expires November 2026)
 Mr. Josh Nicholson (term expires November 2026)
 Mr. Steve Solomon (term expires November 2024)

The current Acting Town Manager is Mr. Chris Cornelison, who took over the position in 2022 after previous town manager Mary Jacobs resigned.  The town manager's office provides executive-level leadership for the community by planning and directing town services. Communications, including Constituent Services, and Economic Development, are under the town manager's department.

The legal services director, Mr. Tobin Sidles, is appointed by the town manager to act as the chief legal advisor to the mayor and council, boards and commissions, the town manager and all town departments.

The town magistrate is the Honorable James Hazel.

The primary law enforcement agency in the town is the Oro Valley Police Department, headed by Chief of Police Kara M. Riley. As of 2014, the OVPD employed 100 sworn police officers, or 2.43 officers per 1,000 citizens.  In 2022, Oro Valley ranked #1 safest place to live in the State of Arizona based upon FBI crime statistics.  It also ranked #1 every year from 2001 through 2006 for the lowest levels of both violent crime and property crime, among cities with populations of 5,000+.  The OVPD has received national recognition for being one of only a few communities in the country where police officers are present at every public school and some private schools.  The OVPD holds many community events on a monthly basis, such as the Dispose-A-Med program where citizens can dispose of unused or expired prescription medications, the Shred-A-Thon where citizens can securely dispose of sensitive documents and records, Digital Child Identification which provides parents with a "biographical docket" of their child's information, the Citizen's Police Academy to increase the public knowledge of the Oro Valley Police Department, and the Darkhouse program where homeowners can request that police members check their vacant residences while they are out of town.

Fire protection and emergency medical service for the town is now entirely provided by the Golder Ranch Fire District.  As of 2017, the GRFD covered a total of 241 square miles and employed 152 personnel with ten stations.

The town is in Arizona's 1st Congressional District, served by Representative Tom O'Halleran, a Democrat and Arizona's 11th State Legislative District, served by Representatives Mark Finchem and Vince Leach and Senator Steve Smith, all Republicans.

Education
Public schools in Oro Valley are administered by Amphitheater Public Schools of Tucson.  Oro Valley is served by five public elementary schools, two K-8 schools, one middle school, and two high schools (Canyon del Oro High School and Ironwood Ridge High School).

Public schools serving Oro Valley include:

Oro Valley also has two charter schools, BASIS Schools Oro Valley (K-12) and Leman Academy of Excellence (K-8).  The Basis school made Newsweek's list of the top ten high schools in the nation, coming in #3 in United States. Oro Valley also has three private schools, Casas Christian School (K-8), Pusch Ridge Christian Academy (K-12), and Immaculate Heart Preparatory School (K-12).

Transportation
Oro Valley is served by Sun Shuttle service to Tucson.

Sites of interest

 Steam Pump Ranch: Located in the heart of Oro Valley, the Steam Pump Ranch dates back to the mid-1870s when George Pusch settled in the area. Pusch was an Arizona state legislator and delegate to the original Arizona Constitutional Convention in 1910. The ranch is in the process of being preserved by the town and includes several original buildings from the ranch itself. It was listed on the National Register of Historic Places in September 2009.
 Catalina State Park: Located on N. Oracle Road (AZ State Hwy. 77). Catalina State Park has a number of hiking and backpacking trails, including Romero Ruin Trail, Nature Trail, Romero Canyon Trail, Sutherland Trail, Canyon Loop Trail, 50-Year Trail, Birding Trail, and the Bridle Trail. Specific trails are also open to equestrians. The park also features several campgrounds and an equestrian center.

 Immaculate Heart Preparatory School: The school is in the former mansion of Margaret Howard, the Countess of Suffolk from the United Kingdom. Built in 1937 as her winter residence, the estate is situated in the Suffolk Hills neighborhood of Oro Valley.
 Honey Bee Village: The Native American Hohokam people occupied a small community in the foothills of the Tortolita Mountains beginning around 500 AD, and the remaining ruins are preserved by the town at the original site on Oro Valley's far north side.
 Bell House: The private estate was completed in the early 1940s. Located just south of Oro Valley, the estate affords expansive views of the Tucson valley to the south. Still privately owned by the Bell family, the estate is closed to the public. Despite their claims to the contrary, the Bell family of Tucson is not descended from Alexander Graham Bell, whose only living children were daughters.
 Romero Ranch: The ruins of the large Romero Ranch are in Catalina State Park east of Oro Valley. Established in 1844 by Francisco Romero, Romero Ranch was one of the first cattle ranches near the Santa Catalina Mountains.
 Canyon del Oro High School: Construction began on the school in the early 1960s before much of the area was developed. Located in south Oro Valley and directly adjacent to Pusch Ridge, CDO is an established community center for the town.
 Oro Valley Public Library: Located in the heart of Oro Valley, on the golf course, with views of Pusch Ridge.

Media
Oro Valley is served by the following publications:

"Oro Valley Voice": A monthly newspaper distributed in Oro valley and Northwest Tucson highlighting local events, businesses and current topics for northwest Tucson.

Arizona Daily Star: A morning daily paper. Sold in 2005 by Pulitzer, Inc. to Lee Enterprises.

Tucson Citizen: was an afternoon daily paper. The Tucson Citizen was the oldest continuously published newspaper in Arizona, established in 1870 as the "Arizona Citizen". It was owned by Gannett but has since ceased publication as of late August 2009.

The Explorer: a free, weekly newspaper covering Northwest Tucson, Oro Valley, Marana and the communities of Catalina Foothills, Tortolita, Catalina and Oracle. The Explorer covers many aspects of suburban Tucson life, including high-school sports and performances, cultural events, features, and stories of political interest.

Tucson Weekly: an alternative publication that is distributed free at numerous locations around the greater Tucson area.

Oro Valley is also served by the following television networks: KVOA 4 (NBC), KGUN 9 (ABC), KOLD 13 (CBS), KMSB 11 (Fox), KTTU 18 (UPN), and KWBA 58 (WB). KUAT 6 is a PBS affiliate run by the University of Arizona.

Notable people
 Alex Bowman – professional stock car racing driver
 Ka'Deem Carey – professional football player
 Brian Disbury – English first-class cricketer, lived in Oro Valley until his death in 2016
 Chris Duncan – professional baseball player
 Shelley Duncan – baseball player
 Scott Hairston – professional baseball player
 Ian Kinsler – Israeli-American professional baseball player
 Blake Martinez – professional football player
 E. William Quirin - businessman and Minnesota state legislator
 Lionel Sanders – professional triathlete

References

External links
 
 Oro Valley Public Library
  Oro Valley Historical Society

Towns in Pima County, Arizona
Geography of Tucson, Arizona
Populated places established in 1874
Populated places established in 1974
Populated places in the Sonoran Desert
1874 establishments in Arizona Territory